Bone Pyat Ba Maung is a 1983 Burmese black-and-white drama film, directed by Myat Tin Aye starring Kawleikgyin Ne Win, Kyaw Hein, Win Nyunt, San Shar Tin and Khin Thida Htun.

Cast
Kawleikgyin Ne Win as Sapalin Hnin Maung
Kyaw Hein as Ba Maung
Win Nyunt as U Htin Kyaw
San Shar Tin as Daw Khin Myo Tint
Khin Thida Htun as Thin Thin

References

1983 films
1980s Burmese-language films
Films shot in Myanmar
Burmese black-and-white films
1983 drama films
Burmese drama films